National Institute for Micro, Small and Medium Enterprises (ni-msme) is a national institute aimed to foster the progress of micro, small and medium enterprises in India under Ministry of Micro, Small and Medium Enterprises. NI-MSME is registered in Hyderabad, Telangana, under Public Societies Registration Act I of 1350 Fasli with effect from 1 July 1962. 
The affairs of the Society are managed, administered, directed and controlled through Governing Council constituted by the Government of India as per Rule 22(a & b) of Rules and Regulations of the Society. The Society, as provided under Rule 3 of Rules and Regulations, was constituted by the Government of India. 
The Institute has been working in the areas of capacity building, research, skill upgradation, job enrichment training in the field of Entrepreneurship and Skill including the development of women pursuing small trades at the cottage industry level from an Incubation centre at NI-MSME.

History

CIETI-SIET

ni-msme was originally set up as Central Industrial Extension Training Institute (CIETI) in New Delhi in 1960 as a Department under the Ministry of Industry and Commerce, Government of India. It was decided to keep it free from the tardy and impeding administrative controls and procedures, so that the Institute can play a pivotal role in the promotion of small enterprise. Therefore the Institute was shifted to Hyderabad in 1962, and was renamed as Small Industry Extension Training (SIET) Institute.

NISIET

SIET was conferred the status of national institute by the Government of India with the charter of assisting in the promotion of Small Enterprises mainly by creating a pro-business environment. In 1984, the UNIDO had recognised SIET as an institute of meritorious performance under its Centres of Excellence Scheme subsequently, it was also accorded the national status in the same year and SIET Institute became nisiet. Since then the institute has come a long way, carving a place of distinction for itself in the domain of entrepreneurship promotion, achieving recognition both at the national level and in the international arena.

NI-MSME

To cope with the pressure of globalisation, the Government of India had enacted the Micro, Small and Medium Enterprises Development Act, 2006 in the Parliament, which became effective from 2 October 2006. Accordingly, the Institute, in order to reflect the expanded focus of its objectives with name was rechristened as ni-msme from 11 April 2007 and re-designed its structure and organisation. It is an organisation of the Ministry of Micro, Small and Medium Enterprises (formerly Ministry of SSI & ARI), Government of India. The ni-msme (formerly as SIET) was registered at Hyderabad in Andhra Pradesh under Public Societies Registration Act I of 1350 Fasli with effect from 1 July 1962.

Director General
March 2019 to present: Dr. S. Glory Swarupa

Schools

School of Enterprise Extension (SEE)
 Centre for Entrepreneurship and Industrial Extension (C-EIE)
 Women Studies Cell (WSC)
 Centre for Consultancy and Counseling (C-CC)

School of Enterprise Development (SED)
 Centre of Industrial Planning and Development (C-IPD)
 ni-msme NGO Network (N-Cube)
 Centre for Policy Research (C-PR)
 National Resource Centre for MSME Cluster Development (NRCD)
 Resource Centre for Traditional Paintings (RCTP)

School of Enterprise Management (SEM)
 Centre for Promotion of Advanced Management Practices (C-PAMP)
 Intellectual Property Facilitation Centre (IPFC)
 Centre for Environmental Concerns (C-Eco)
 Centre for Industrial Credit and Financial Services (C-ICFS)

School of Enterprise Information & Communication (SEIC)
 Centre for Communication and Information Technology (C-CIT)
 Small Enterprises National Documentation Centre (SENDOC)

Publications
 Small Enterprises Development, Management & Extension
 Journal of Entrepreneurship, Innovation, Management and Skill Development (JIEMS)

Activities

1964-2008
 Research study in developing the first entrepreneurship model – Prof. David Mc-Clelland;s Kakinada Experiment (1964)
 First International Programme on SMEs in the country (1967)
 Programme for Young Engineers and Technocrats for the first time in the country (1970)
 Establishment of a unique Centre in the country named Small Enterprises National Documentation Centre (SENDOC) (1970)
 Initiated Area Development Programmes in Enterprise Promotion in the country (1971)
 First study on Growth Centres (1973)
 Establishing and sustaining a Branch Regional Centre in North-Eastern Region for the first time in the country (1979)
 Orientation on Small Industry Development for IAS Officers (1986–89)
 Preparation of case studies and video documentaries on science and technology entrepreneurs in Orissa. West Bengal and Andhra Pradesh (1986)
 Policy Research Studies on various aspects of Small Industry (1986, 1989, 1992, 1997)
 The first computerized Software Package Developed on simulation exercises for Small Industry Management (SIMSIM) 1987
 Project Apraisal and Evaluation (CAPE-1996)
 Recognition by the University of Hyderabad as Centre for Advanced Studies and Research in Small Industry Development (1991)
 Preparation of video on the progress of Integrated Industrial Development (IIC) Centres in States and the National Awards function New Delhi (1995)
 Compilation of the Directory of Small Enterprises of Excellence (1995)
 UNESCO Chair (1997)
 Enterprise Development Government and Effectiveness Programme (EDGE) for Sri Lankan Administrative Officials (1998)
 Export Production Villages (1999)
 B2B Transactions with Uganda, Namibia, South Africa, Bhutan (2000), Nigeria (2001), Sudan, Cameroon, Ghana (2002)
 Child Labour Eradication Programme by International Labour Organization (201), in selected districts of Andhra Pradesh, ILO, Project (2002–03).
 Entrepreneurship Development Programmes (EDPs) for VRS/Rationalized Employees in State and Central Public Sector Units (from 2001 onwards)
 Achieved self-sufficiency in recurring expenses (2001–02)
 Ministry of Heavy Industry & Public Enterprises, Govt. of India recognized the Employee Assistance Cell (EAC) at ni-msme as Nodal Agency for training and rehabilitation of rationalized employees of Central Public Sector Undertakings (CPSUs) (2002)
 Study on Identification of Projects for specific Resource Base in North-Eastern Region (2003)
 Vision Document for Empowering Women in Mauritius (2003)
 Project Profiles on SMEs for Mauritius (2004)
 Hand-holding, Monitoring and Implementation of MSME Clusters (2004–07)
 Entrepreneurship Development Inputs in Professional Colleges (2004)
 Curriculum Development of Entrepreneurship: Comparative Study in selected States of India (2004)
 Handholding for SFURTI, Handlooms, Handicrafts Clusters (2006 onwards)
 Status of Women Entrepreneurship in Andhra Pradesh (2007)
 Impact study of Entrepreneurship Development Programmes (EDPs) organized by MSME – Development Institutes on Self-Employment and Wage Employment (2008)
 Evaluation of Entrepreneurship Development Institutes (EDIs) in India (2008)

2009–2018

2019-20
 NI-MSME has trained over 10,000 international participants in its nearly six decades since inception with more than 5.3 lakh local people have trained in over 15,800 programmes. In year 2019, three modules were conducted 73 participants from 28 nations got trained.
 The responsibility of setting up this Moonj bank — a storehouse for the wild Moonj grass used for making a range of household and decorative products – has been entrusted to the National Institute for Micro, Small and Medium Enterprises (NIMSME), Hyderabad, which will strive to find suitable markets for the Moonj products.
On the occasion of International Women's day 13 women entrepreneurs and achievers were felicitated at the Shakti National Convention held at NIMSME Campus, Hyderabad.
NIMSME took a green initiative by planting 1200 saplings on the campus was launched by the Director-General.

See also
 List of institutes funded by the Central Government of India
 Indian Institutes of Technology
 Indian Institute of Engineering Science and Technology
 National Institutes of Technology
 Indian Ethos in Management
 Institute of National Importance

References

External links
 Development Commissioner, Ministry of Micro, Small & Medium Enterprises
 Ministry of Micro, Small & Medium Enterprises
 

Ministry of Micro, Small and Medium Enterprises
Small-scale industry in India
Business schools in India
Indian Institutes of Management